Königsberg was the historic German and Prussian name of the city that is now Kaliningrad, Russia.

Königsberg was founded in 1255 on the site of the small Old Prussian settlement Twangste by the Teutonic Knights during the Northern Crusades, and was named in honour of King Ottokar II of Bohemia. A Baltic port city, it successively became the capital of the State of the Teutonic Order, the Duchy of Prussia and the provinces of East Prussia and Prussia. Königsberg remained the coronation city of the Prussian monarchy from 1701 onwards, though the capital was Berlin.

From the thirteenth to the twentieth centuries on, the inhabitants spoke predominantly German, but the city also had a profound influence upon the Lithuanian and Polish cultures. The city was a publishing center of Lutheran literature, including the first Polish translation of the New Testament, printed in the city in 1551, the first book in Lithuanian and the first Lutheran catechism, both printed in Königsberg in 1547.

A university city, home of the Albertina University (founded in 1544), Königsberg developed into an important German intellectual and cultural center, being the residence of Simon Dach, Immanuel Kant, Käthe Kollwitz, E. T. A. Hoffmann, David Hilbert, Agnes Miegel, Hannah Arendt, Michael Wieck and others.

Königsberg was the easternmost large city in Germany until World War II. Between the wars it was in the exclave of East Prussia, separated from Germany by the Polish Corridor.

The city was heavily damaged by Allied bombing in 1944 and during the Battle of Königsberg in 1945, when it was occupied by the Red Army. The Potsdam Agreement of 1945 placed it provisionally under Soviet administration, and it was annexed by the Soviet Union on 9 April 1945. Its small Lithuanian population was allowed to remain, but its German population was expelled, and the city was largely repopulated with Russians and, to a lesser degree, Ukrainians from the Soviet Union after the ethnic cleansing. It was renamed Kaliningrad in 1946, in honour of communist functionary Mikhail Kalinin. The city's historic centre was subsequently demolished by the Soviet government.

It is now the capital of Russia's Kaliningrad Oblast, an exclave bordered in the north by Lithuania and in the south by Poland. In the Final Settlement treaty of 1990, Germany renounced all claims to this city.

Name
The first mention of the present-day location in chronicles indicates it as the place of a village of fishermen and hunters. When the Teutonic Order began the Baltic Crusades, they built a wooden fortress, and later a stone fortress, calling it "Conigsberg", which later morphed into "Königsberg". The literal meaning of this is 'King's mountain', in apparent honour of King Ottokar II of Bohemia, who led one of the Teutonic campaigns.

In Polish, the city is called , and in Lithuanian, it is called  (each a translation of the original German name).

History

Sambians
 

Königsberg was preceded by a Sambian, or Old Prussian, fort known as Twangste (Tuwangste, Tvankste), meaning 'Oak Forest', as well as several Old Prussian settlements, including the fishing village and port Lipnick, and the farming villages Sakkeim and Trakkeim.

Arrival of the Teutonic Order

During the conquest of the Prussian Sambians by the Teutonic Knights in 1255, Twangste was destroyed and replaced with a new fortress known as Conigsberg. This name meant "King’s Hill", honoring King Ottokar II of Bohemia, who paid for the erection of the first fortress there during the Prussian Crusade.

The Teutonic Order used Königsberg to fortify their conquests in Samland and as a base for campaigns against pagan Lithuania. Under siege during the Prussian uprisings in 1262–63, Königsberg Castle was relieved by the Master of the Livonian Order. Because the initial northwestern settlement was destroyed by the Prussians during the rebellion, rebuilding occurred in the southern valley between the castle hill and the Pregolya River. This new settlement, Altstadt, received Culm rights in 1286. Löbenicht, a new town directly east of Altstadt between the Pregolya and the Schlossteich, received its own rights in 1300. Medieval Königsberg's third town was Kneiphof, which received town rights in 1327 and was located on an island of the same name in the Pregolya south of Altstadt.

Within the state of the Teutonic Order, Königsberg was the residence of the marshal, one of the chief administrators of the military order. The city was also the seat of the Bishopric of Samland, one of the four dioceses into which Prussia had been divided in 1243 by the papal legate, William of Modena. Adalbert of Prague became the main patron saint of Königsberg Cathedral, a landmark of the city located in Kneiphof.

Königsberg joined the Hanseatic League in 1340 and developed into an important port for the south-eastern Baltic region, trading goods throughout Prussia, the Kingdom of Poland, and the Grand Duchy of Lithuania. The chronicler Peter of Dusburg probably wrote his Chronicon terrae Prussiae in Königsberg from 1324 to 1330. After the Teutonic Order's victory over pagan Lithuanians in the 1348 Battle of Strėva, Grand Master Winrich von Kniprode established a Cistercian nunnery in the city. Aspiring students were educated in Königsberg before continuing on to higher education elsewhere, such as Prague or Leipzig.

Although the knights suffered a crippling defeat in the Battle of Grunwald, Königsberg remained under the control of the Teutonic Knights throughout the Polish-Lithuanian-Teutonic War. Livonian knights replaced the Prussian branch's garrison at Königsberg, allowing them to participate in the recovery of towns occupied by Władysław II Jagiełło's troops.

Polish sovereignty
Since 1440, the city was a founding member of the anti-Teutonic Prussian Confederation. In 1454 the Confederation rebelled against the Teutonic Knights and asked the Polish King Casimir IV Jagiellon to incorporate Prussia into the Kingdom of Poland, to which the King agreed and signed an act of incorporation. The local mayor pledged allegiance to the Polish King during the incorporation in March 1454. This marked the beginning of the Thirteen Years' War (1454–1466) between the State of the Teutonic Order and the Kingdom of Poland. The city, known in Polish as Królewiec, became the seat of the short-lived Królewiec Voivodeship. King Casimir IV authorized the city to mint Polish coins. While Königsberg/Królewiec's three towns initially joined the rebellion, Altstadt and Löbenicht soon rejoined the Teutonic Knights and defeated Kneiphof (Knipawa) in 1455. Grand Master Ludwig von Erlichshausen fled from the crusaders' capital at Castle Marienburg (Malbork) to Königsberg in 1457; the city's magistrate presented Erlichshausen with a barrel of beer out of compassion.

Following the Second Peace of Thorn (1466), which ended the Thirteen Years' War, Königsberg became the new capital of the reduced monastic state, which became a part of the Kingdom of Poland as a fief. The grand masters took over the quarters of the marshal. During the Polish-Teutonic War (1519–1521), Königsberg was unsuccessfully besieged by Polish forces led by Grand Crown Hetman Mikołaj Firlej. The city itself opposed the Teutonic Knights' war against Poland and demanded peace.

Duchy of Prussia
Through the preachings of the Bishop of Samland, Georg von Polenz, Königsberg became predominantly Lutheran during the Protestant Reformation. After summoning a quorum of the Knights to Königsberg, Grand Master Albert of Brandenburg (a member of the House of Hohenzollern) secularised the Teutonic Knights' remaining territories in Prussia in 1525 and converted to Lutheranism. By paying feudal homage to his uncle, King Sigismund I of Poland, Albert became the first duke of the new Duchy of Prussia, a fief of Poland.

While the Prussian estates quickly allied with the duke, the Prussian peasantry would only swear allegiance to Albert in person at Königsberg, seeking the duke's support against the oppressive nobility. After convincing the rebels to lay down their arms, Albert had several of their leaders executed.

Königsberg, the capital, became one of the biggest cities and ports of Ducal Prussia, having considerable autonomy, a separate parliament and currency. While German continued to be the official language, the city served as a vibrant center of publishing in both Polish and Lithuanian. The city flourished through the export of wheat, timber, hemp, and furs, as well as pitch, tar, and fly ash.

Königsberg was one of the few Baltic ports regularly visited by more than one hundred ships annually in the latter 16th century, along with Gdańsk and Riga. The University of Königsberg, founded by Duke Albert in 1544 and receiving token royal approval from King Sigismund II Augustus in 1560, became a center of Protestant teaching. The university had a profound impact on the development of Lithuanian culture, and several important Lithuanian writers attended the Albertina (see Lithuanians section below). Poles, including several notable figures, were also among the staff and students of the university (see Poles section below). The university was also the preferred educational institution of the Baltic German nobility.

The capable Duke Albert was succeeded by his feeble-minded son, Albert Frederick. Anna, daughter of Albert Frederick, married Elector John Sigismund of Brandenburg, who was granted the right of succession to Prussia on Albert Frederick's death in 1618. From this time the Electors of Brandenburg, the rulers of Brandenburg-Prussia, governed the Duchy of Prussia.

Brandenburg-Prussia
When Imperial and then Swedish armies overran Brandenburg during the Thirty Years' War of 1618–1648, the Hohenzollern court fled to Königsberg. On 1 November 1641, Elector Frederick William persuaded the Prussian diet to accept an excise tax. In the Treaty of Königsberg of January 1656, the elector recognised his Duchy of Prussia as a fief of Sweden. In the Treaty of Wehlau in 1657, however, he negotiated the release of Prussia from Polish sovereignty in return for an alliance with Poland. The 1660 Treaty of Oliva confirmed Prussian independence from both Poland and Sweden.

In 1661 Frederick William informed the Prussian diet that he possessed jus supremi et absoluti domini, and that the Prussian Landtag could convene with his permission. The Königsberg burghers, led by Hieronymus Roth of Kneiphof, opposed "the Great Elector's" absolutist claims, and actively rejected the Treaties of Wehlau and Oliva, seeing Prussia as "indisputably contained within the territory of the Polish Crown". Delegations from the city's burghers went to the Polish king, John II Casimir Vasa, who initially promised aid, but then failed to follow through. The town's residents attacked the elector's troops while local Lutheran priests held masses for the Polish king and for the Polish–Lithuanian Commonwealth. However, Frederick William succeeded in imposing his authority after arriving with 3,000 troops in October 1662 and training his artillery on the town. Refusing to request mercy, Roth went to prison in Peitz until his death in 1678.

The Prussian estates which swore fealty to Frederick William in Königsberg on 18 October 1663 refused the elector's requests for military funding, and Colonel Christian Ludwig von Kalckstein sought assistance from neighbouring Poland. After the elector's agents had abducted Kalckstein, he was executed in 1672. The Prussian estates' submission to Frederick William followed; in 1673 and 1674 the elector received taxes not granted by the estates and Königsberg received a garrison without the estates' consent. The economic and political weakening of Königsberg strengthened the power of the Junker nobility within Prussia.

Königsberg long remained a center of Lutheran resistance to Calvinism within Brandenburg-Prussia; Frederick William forced the city to accept Calvinist citizens and property-holders in 1668.

Kingdom of Prussia

By the act of coronation in Königsberg Castle on 18 January 1701, Frederick William's son, Elector Frederick III, became Frederick I, King in Prussia. The elevation of the Duchy of Prussia to the Kingdom of Prussia was possible because the Hohenzollerns' authority in Prussia was independent of Poland and the Holy Roman Empire. Since "Kingdom of Prussia" was increasingly used to designate all of the Hohenzollern lands, former ducal Prussia became known as the Province of Prussia (1701–1773), with Königsberg as its capital. However, Berlin and Potsdam in Brandenburg were the main residences of the Prussian kings.

The city was wracked by plague and other illnesses from September 1709 to April 1710, losing 9,368 people, or roughly a quarter of its populace. On 13 June 1724, Altstadt, Kneiphof, and Löbenicht amalgamated to formally create the larger city Königsberg. Suburbs that subsequently were annexed to Königsberg include Sackheim, Rossgarten, and Tragheim.

Russian Empire
During the Seven Years' War of 1756 to 1763 Imperial Russian troops occupied eastern Prussia at the beginning of 1758. On 31 December 1757, Empress Elizabeth I of Russia issued an ukase about the incorporation of Königsberg into Russia. On 24 January 1758, the leading burghers of Königsberg submitted to Elizabeth. Under the terms of the Treaty of Saint Petersburg (signed 5 May 1762) Russia exited the Seven Years' War, the Russian army abandoned eastern Prussia, and the city reverted to Prussian control.

Kingdom of Prussia after 1773 
After the First Partition of Poland in 1772, Königsberg became the capital of the newly formed province of East Prussia in 1773, which replaced the Province of Prussia in 1773. By 1800 the city was approximately five miles in circumference and had 60,000 inhabitants, including a military garrison of 7,000, making it one of the most populous German cities of the time.

After Prussia's defeat at the hands of Napoleon Bonaparte in 1806 during the War of the Fourth Coalition and the subsequent occupation of Berlin, King Frederick William III of Prussia fled with his court from Berlin to Königsberg. The city was a centre for political resistance to Napoleon. In order to foster liberalism and nationalism among the Prussian middle class, the "League of Virtue" was founded in Königsberg in April 1808. The French forced its dissolution in December 1809, but its ideals were continued by the Turnbewegung of Friedrich Ludwig Jahn in Berlin. Königsberg officials, such as Johann Gottfried Frey, formulated much of Stein's 1808 Städteordnung, or new order for urban communities, which emphasised self-administration for Prussian towns. The East Prussian Landwehr was organised from the city after the Convention of Tauroggen.

In 1819 Königsberg had a population of 63,800. It served as the capital of the united Province of Prussia from 1824 to 1878, when East Prussia was merged with West Prussia. It was also the seat of the Regierungsbezirk Königsberg, an administrative subdivision.

Led by the provincial president Theodor von Schön and the Königsberger Volkszeitung newspaper, Königsberg was a stronghold of liberalism against the conservative government of King Frederick William IV. During the revolution of 1848, there were 21 episodes of public unrest in the city; major demonstrations were suppressed. Königsberg became part of the German Empire in 1871 during the Prussian-led unification of Germany. A sophisticated-for-its-time series of fortifications around the city that included fifteen forts was completed in 1888.

The extensive Prussian Eastern Railway linked the city to Breslau, Thorn, Insterburg, Eydtkuhnen, Tilsit, and Pillau. In 1860 the railway connecting Berlin with St. Petersburg was completed and increased Königsberg's commerce. Extensive electric tramways were in operation by 1900; and regular steamers plied the waterways to Memel, Tapiau and Labiau, Cranz, Tilsit, and Danzig. The completion of a canal to Pillau in 1901 increased the trade of Russian grain in Königsberg, but, like much of eastern Germany, the city's economy was generally in decline. The city was an important entrepôt for Scottish herring. in 1904 the export peaked at more than 322 thousand barrels. By 1900 the city's population had grown to 188,000, with a 9,000-strong military garrison. By 1914 Königsberg had a population of 246,000; Jews flourished in the culturally pluralistic city.

Weimar Republic

Following the defeat of the Central Powers in World War I, Imperial Germany was replaced with the democratic Weimar Republic. The Kingdom of Prussia ended with the abdication of the Hohenzollern monarch, Wilhelm II, and the kingdom was succeeded by the Free State of Prussia. Königsberg and East Prussia, however, were separated from the rest of Weimar Germany following the restoration of independent Poland and the creation of the so-called Polish Corridor. Due to the isolated geographical situation after World War I the German Government supported a lot of large infrastructure projects: 1919 Airport "Devenau" (the first civil airport in Germany), 1920 "Deutsche Ostmesse" (a new German trade fare; including new hotels and radio station), 1929 reconstruction of the railway system including the new central railway station and 1930 opening of the North station.

Nazi Germany
In 1932 the local paramilitary SA had already started to terrorise their political opponents. On the night of 31 July 1932 there was a bomb attack on the headquarters of the Social Democrats in Königsberg, the Otto-Braun-House. The Communist politician Gustav Sauf was killed, and the executive editor of the Social Democrat "Königsberger Volkszeitung", Otto Wyrgatsch, and the German People's Party politician Max von Bahrfeldt were severely injured. Members of the Reichsbanner were attacked and the local Reichsbanner Chairman of Lötzen (Giżycko), Kurt Kotzan, was murdered on 6 August 1932.

Following Adolf Hitler's coming to power, Nazis confiscated Jewish shops and, as in the rest of Germany, a public book burning was organised, accompanied by anti-Semitic speeches in May 1933 at the Trommelplatz square. Street names and monuments of Jewish origin were removed, and signs such as "Jews are not welcomed in hotels" started appearing. As part of the state-wide "aryanisation" of the civil service Jewish academics were ejected from the university.

In July 1934 Hitler made a speech in the city in front of 25,000 supporters. In 1933 the NSDAP alone received 54% of votes in the city. After the Nazis took power in Germany, opposition politicians were persecuted and newspapers were banned. The Otto-Braun-House was requisitioned and became the headquarters of the SA, which used the house to imprison and torture opponents. Walter Schütz, a communist member of the Reichstag, was murdered there. Many who would not co-operate with the rulers of Nazi Germany were sent to concentration camps and held prisoner there until their death or liberation.

In 1935, the Wehrmacht designated Königsberg as the Headquarters for Wehrkreis I (under the command of General der Artillerie Albert Wodrig), which took in all of East Prussia. According to the census of May 1939, Königsberg had a population of 372,164.

In World War II both Koenigsberg and Berlin had large Fernschreibstelle (teleprinter offices) for the German Army which collected morning messages each day from regional or local centres to be sent in long messages to headquarters. They also had a Geheimschreibstube or cipher room where plaintext messages could be encrypted on  Lorenz SZ40/42 machines . If sent by radio rather than landline they were  intercepted and decrypted at Bletchley Park in England, where they were known as Fish. Some messages were daily returns, and some were between Hitler and his generals; both were valuable to Allied intelligence. Koenigsberg had links over the Eastern Front.

Persecution of Jews under the Nazi regime
Prior to the Nazi era, Königsberg was home to a third of East Prussia's 13,000 Jews. Under Nazi rule, the Polish and Jewish minorities were classified as Untermensch and persecuted by the authorities. The city's Jewish population shrank from 3,200 in 1933 to 2,100 in October 1938. The New Synagogue of Königsberg, constructed in 1896, was destroyed during Kristallnacht (9 November 1938); 500 Jews soon fled the city.

After the Wannsee Conference of 20 January 1942, Königsberg's Jews began to be deported to various Nazi concentration camps: The SS sent the first and largest group of Jewish deportees, comprising 465 Jewish men, women and children, from Königsberg and East Prussia to the Maly Trostenets extermination camp near Minsk on 24 June 1942. Almost all were murdered soon after their arrival. Additional transports from Königsberg to the Theresienstadt ghetto and Auschwitz took place until 1945.

In 1944–1945, the Germans operated a sub-camp of the Stutthof concentration camp in Königsberg, where they imprisoned around 500 Jews as forced labour. In 1939, the Germans also established a forced labour camp for Romani people in the city.

Persecution of Poles during World War II
In September 1939, with the German invasion of Poland underway, the Polish consulate in Königsberg was attacked (which constituted a violation of international law), its workers arrested and sent to concentration camps where several of them died. Polish students at the local university were captured, tortured and finally executed. Other victims included local Polish civilians guillotined for petty violations of German law and regulations such as buying and selling meat.

In September 1944 69,000 slave labourers were registered in the city (not counting prisoners of war), with most of them working on the outskirts; within the city were 15,000 slave labourers. All of them were denied freedom of movement, forced to wear a "P" sign, if Poles, or "Ost" sign, if they were from the Soviet Union, and were watched by special units of the Gestapo and Wehrmacht. They were denied basic spiritual and physical needs and food, and suffered from famine and exhaustion. The conditions of the forced labour were described as "tragic", especially for Poles and Soviets, who were treated harshly by their German overseers. Ordered to paint German ships with toxic paints and chemicals, they were neither given gas-masks nor was there any ventilation in facilities where they worked, supposedly in order to expedite construction, while the substances evaporated in temperatures as high as 40 Celsius. As a result, there were cases of sudden illness or death during the work.

Destruction in World War II

In 1944, Königsberg suffered heavy damage from British bombing attacks and burned for several days. The historic city center, especially the original quarters Altstadt, Löbenicht, and Kneiphof were destroyed, including the cathedral, the castle, all churches of the old city, the old and the new universities, and the old shipping quarters.

Many people fled from Königsberg ahead of the Red Army's advance after October 1944, particularly after word spread of the Soviet atrocities at Nemmersdorf. In early 1945, Soviet forces, under the command of the Polish-born Soviet Marshal Konstantin Rokossovsky, besieged the city that Hitler had envisaged as the home for a museum holding all the Germans had 'found in Russia'. In Operation Samland, General Baghramyan's 1st Baltic Front, now known as the Samland Group, captured Königsberg in April. Although Hitler had declared Königsberg an "invincible bastion of German spirit", the Soviets captured the city after a three-month-long siege. A temporary German breakout had allowed some of the remaining civilians to escape via train and naval evacuation from the nearby port of Pillau. Königsberg, which had been declared a "fortress" (Festung) by the Germans, was fanatically defended.

On 21 January, during the Red Army's East Prussian Offensive, mostly Polish and Hungarian Jews from Seerappen, Jesau, Heiligenbeil, Schippenbeil, and Gerdauen (subcamps of Stutthof concentration camp) were gathered in Königsberg by the Nazis. Up to 7,000 of them were forced on a death march to Sambia: those that survived were subsequently executed at Palmnicken.

On 9 April – one month before the end of the war in Europe – the German military commander of Königsberg, General Otto Lasch, surrendered the remnants of his forces, following the three-month-long siege by the Red Army. For this act, Lasch was condemned to death, in absentia, by Hitler. At the time of the surrender, military and civilian dead in the city were estimated at 42,000, with the Red Army claiming over 90,000 prisoners. Lasch's subterranean command bunker is preserved as a museum in today's Kaliningrad.

About 120,000 survivors remained in the ruins of the devastated city. The German civilians were held as forced labourers until 1946. Only the Lithuanians, a small minority of the pre-war population, were collectively allowed to stay. Between October 1947 and October 1948, about 100,000 Germans were forcibly moved to Germany. The remaining 20,000 German residents were expelled in 1949–50.

According to Soviet documents, there were 140,114 German inhabitants in September 1945 in the region that later became the Kaliningrad Oblast, thereof  68,014 in Königsberg. Between April 1947 and May 1951, according to Soviet documents, 102,407 were deported to the Soviet occupation zone of Germany. How many of the deportees were from the city of Königsberg does not become apparent from Soviet records. It is estimated that 43,617 Germans were in the city in the spring of 1946. According to German historian Andreas Kossert, there were about 100,000 to 126,000 German civilians in the city at the time of Soviet conquest, and of these only 24,000 survived to be deported in 1947.  Hunger accounted for 75% of the deaths, epidemics (especially typhoid fever) for 2.6% and violence for 15%, according to Kossert.

Soviet Kaliningrad

Under the Potsdam Agreement of 1 August 1945, the city became part of the Soviet Union pending the final determination of territorial borders at an anticipated peace settlement issued by military general Mingailas Paskauskas. This final determination eventually took place on 12 September 1990 when the Treaty on the Final Settlement with Respect to Germany was signed. The excerpt from the initial agreement pertaining to the partition of East Prussia, including the area surrounding Königsberg, is as follows (note that Königsberg is spelt "Koenigsberg" in the original document):

VI. CITY OF KOENIGSBERG AND THE ADJACENT AREAThe Conference examined a proposal by the Soviet Government that pending the final determination of territorial questions at the peace settlement, the section of the western frontier of the Union of Soviet Socialist Republics which is adjacent to the Baltic Sea should pass from a point on the eastern shore of the Bay of Danzig to the east, north of Braunsberg – Goldep, to the meeting point of the frontiers of Lithuania, the Polish Republic and East Prussia.

The Conference has agreed in principle to the proposal of the Soviet Government concerning the ultimate transfer to the Soviet Union of the city of Koenigsberg and the area adjacent to it as described above, subject to expert examination of the actual frontier.

The President of the United States and the British Prime Minister supported the proposal of the Conference at the forthcoming peace settlement.

Königsberg was renamed Kaliningrad in 1946 after the Chairman of the Presidium of the Supreme Soviet of the USSR Mikhail Kalinin, although Kalinin was unrelated to the city, and there were already cities named in honour of Kalinin in the Soviet Union, namely Kalinin (now Tver) and Kaliningrad (now Korolev, Moscow Oblast).

Some historians speculate that it may have originally been offered to the Lithuanian SSR because the resolution from the conference specifies that Kaliningrad's border would be at the (pre-war) Lithuanian frontier. The remaining German population was forcibly expelled between 1947 and 1948. The annexed territory was populated with Soviet citizens, mostly ethnic Russians but to a lesser extent also Ukrainians and Belarusians.

The German language was replaced with the Russian language. In 1950, there were 1,165,000 inhabitants, which was only half the number of the pre-war population.

From 1953 to 1962, a monument to Stalin stood on Victory Square. In 1973, the town hall was turned into the House of Soviets. In 1975, the trolleybus was launched again. In 1980, a concert hall was opened in the building of the former Lutheran Church of the Holy Family. In 1986, the Kreuzkirche building was transferred to the Russian Orthodox Church.

For foreigners, the city was completely closed and, with the exception of rare visits of friendship from neighboring Poland, it was practically not visited by foreigners.

The old city was not restored, and the ruins of the Königsberg Castle were demolished in the late 1960s, on Leonid Brezhnev's personal orders, despite the protests of architects, historians, local historians and ordinary residents of the city.

The "reconstruction" of the oblast, threatened by hunger in the immediate post-war years, was carried out through an ambitious policy of oceanic fishing with the creation of one of the main fishing harbours of the USSR in Kaliningrad city. Fishing not only fed the regional economy but also was a basis for social and scientific development, in particular oceanography.

In 1957, an agreement was signed and later came into force which delimited the border between Polish People's Republic (Soviet satellite state at the time) and the Soviet Union.

The region was added as a semi-exclave to the Russian SFSR; since 1946 it has been known as the Kaliningrad Oblast. According to some historians, Stalin created it as an oblast separate from the Lithuanian SSR because it further separated the Baltic states from the West. Others think that the reason was that the region was far too strategic for the USSR to leave it in the hands of another SSR other than the Russian one. The names of the cities, towns, rivers, and other geographical features were changed to Russian names.

The area was administered by the planning committee of the Lithuanian SSR, although it had its own Communist Party committee. In the 1950s, Nikita Khrushchev offered the entire Kaliningrad Oblast to the Lithuanian SSR but Antanas Sniečkus refused to accept the territory because it would add at least a million ethnic Russians to Lithuania proper.

In 2010, the German magazine Der Spiegel published a report claiming that Kaliningrad had been offered to Germany in 1990 (against payment). The offer was not seriously considered by the West German government which, at the time, saw reunification with East Germany as a higher priority. However, this story was later denied by Mikhail Gorbachev.

Demographics
Following the Christianization of the region, the vast majority of the population was Catholic, and after the Reformation, the majority of the population belonged to the Evangelical Church of Prussia. A majority of its parishioners were Lutherans, although there were also Calvinists.
Number of inhabitants, by year
 1400:  10,000
 1663:  40,000
 1819:  63,869
 1840:  70,839
 1855:  83,593
 1871: 112,092
 1880: 140,909
 1890: 172,796
 1900: 189,483 (including the military), among whom were 8,465 Roman Catholics and 3,975 Jews.
 1905: 223,770, among whom were 10,320 Roman Catholics, 4,415 Jews and 425 Poles.
 1910:	245,994
 1919: 260,895
 1925: 279,930, among whom were 13,330 Catholics, 4,050 Jews and approximately 6,000 others.
 1933: 315,794
 1939: 372,164
 1945:  73,000

Jews

The Jewish community in the city had its origins in the 16th century, with the arrival of the first Jews in 1538. The first synagogue was built in 1756. A second, smaller synagogue which served Orthodox Jews was constructed later, eventually becoming the New Synagogue.

The Jewish population of Königsberg in the 18th century was fairly low, although this changed as restrictions became relaxed over the course of the 19th century. In 1756 there were 29 families of "protected Jews" in Königsberg, which increased to 57 by 1789. The total number of Jewish inhabitants was less than 500 in the middle of the 18th century, and around 800 by the end of it, out of a total population of almost 60,000 people.

The number of Jewish inhabitants peaked in 1880 at about 5,000, many of whom were migrants escaping pogroms in the Russian Empire. This number declined subsequently so that by 1933, when the Nazis took over, the city had about 3,200 Jews. As a result of anti-semitism and persecution in the 1920s and 1930s two-thirds of the city's Jews emigrated, mostly to the US and Great Britain. Those who remained were shipped by the Germans to concentration camps in two waves; first in 1938 to various camps in Germany, and the second in 1942 to the Theresienstadt concentration camp in occupied Czechoslovakia, Kaiserwald concentration camp in occupied Latvia, as well as camps in Minsk in the occupied Byelorussian Soviet Socialist Republic.

Lithuanians
The University of Königsberg was an important center of Protestant Lithuanian culture and studies. Abraomas Kulvietis and Stanislovas Rapalionis are also seen as important early Lithuanian scholars. Daniel Klein published the first Lithuanian grammar book in Königsberg in 1653.

Poles

Poles were among the first professors of the University of Königsberg, which received the royal Law of Privilege from King Sigismund II Augustus of Poland on 28 March 1560. University of Königsberg lecturers included Hieronim Malecki (theology), Maciej Menius (astronomy) and Jan Mikulicz-Radecki (medicine). Jan Kochanowski and Stanislaw Sarnicki were among the first students known to be Polish, later Florian Ceynowa, Wojciech Kętrzynski and Julian Klaczko studied in Königsberg. For 24 years Celestyn Myślenta (who first registered at the University as "Polonus") was a seven time rector of the university, while Maciej Menius was a three times rector. From 1728 there was a "Polish Seminar" at the seminary of Protestant theology, which operated until the early 1930s and had developed a number of pastors, including Krzysztof Celestyn Mrongovius and August Grzybowski. Duke Albert of Prussia established a press in Königsberg that issued thousands of Polish pamphlets and religious books. During the Reformation Königsberg became a place of refuge for Polish Protestant adherents, a training ground for Polish Protestant clergy and a source of Polish Protestant literature. In 1564 Jan Mączyński issued his Polish-Latin lexicon at Königsberg.

According to historian Janusz Jasiński, based on estimates obtained from the records of St. Nicholas's Church, during the 1530s Lutheran Poles constituted about one quarter of the city population. This does not include Polish Catholics or Calvinists who did not have centralised places of worship until the 17th century, hence records that far back for these two groups are not available.

From the 16th to 20th centuries, the city was a publishing center of Polish-language religious literature. In 1545 in Königsberg a Polish catechism was printed by Jan Seklucjan. In 1551 the first translation of the New Testament in Polish came out, issued by Stanisław Murzynowski. Murzynowski's collections of sermons were delivered by Eustachy Trepka and in 1574 by Hieronim Malecki. The works of Mikolaj Rej were printed here by Seklucjan. Maciej Stryjkowski announced in Königsberg the publication of his Kronika Polska, Litewska, Żmudzka, i wszystkiej Rusi ("A Chronicle of Poland, Lithuania, Samogitia and all Rus").

Although formally the relationship of these lands with Poland stopped at the end of the 17th century, in practice the Polish element in Königsberg played a significant role for the next century, until the outbreak of World War II. Before the second half of the 19th century many municipal institutions (e.g. courts, magistrates) employed Polish translators, and there was a course in Polish at the university. Polish books were issued as well as magazines with the last one being the Kalendarz Staropruski Ewangelicki (Old Prussian Evangelical Calendar) issued between 1866 and 1931.

During the Protestant Reformation the oldest church in Königsberg, St. Nicholas, was opened for non-Germans, especially Lithuanians and Poles. Services for Lithuanians started in 1523, and by the mid-16th century also included ones for Poles. By 1603 it had become a solely Polish-language church as Lithuanian service was moved to St. Elizabeth. In 1880 St. Nicholas was converted to a German-language church; weekly Polish services remained only for Masurians in the Prussian Army, although those were halted in 1901. The church was bombed in 1944, further damaged in 1945, and the remaining ruins were demolished after the war in 1950.

Culture and society of Königsberg

Notable people

Königsberg was the birthplace of the mathematician Christian Goldbach and the writer E.T.A. Hoffmann, as well as the home of the philosopher Immanuel Kant, who lived there virtually all his life and rarely travelled more than ten miles away from the city. Kant entered the university of Königsberg at age 16 and was appointed to a chair in metaphysics there in 1770 at the age of 46. While working there he published his Critique of Pure Reason (arguing that knowledge arises from the application of innate concepts to sensory experience) and his Metaphysics of Morals which argues that virtue is acquired by the performance of duty for its own sake. In 1736, the Swiss mathematician Leonhard Euler used the arrangement of the city's bridges and islands as the basis for the Seven Bridges of Königsberg Problem, which led to the mathematical branches of topology and graph theory. In 1862, David Hilbert was born in Königsberg; he established himself as one of the world's most influential mathematicians by the turn of the century. Noted South African baboon rescuer Rita Miljo (1931-2012) grew up in Königsberg.

Languages
The language of government and high culture was German. The Low Prussian dialect was widely spoken, but is now a moribund language as its refugee speakers are elderly and dying out. As the capital of the region of East Prussia which was a multi-ethnic territory, diverse languages such as Latvian, Lithuanian, Polish, and Yiddish were commonly heard on the streets of Königsberg. Old Prussian, a Baltic language, became extinct in the 18th century.

The visual and performing arts

In the Königsstraße (King Street) stood the Academy of Art with a collection of over 400 paintings. About 50 works were by Italian masters; some early Dutch paintings were also to be found there. At the King's Gate stood statues of King Ottakar I of Bohemia, Albert of Prussia, and Frederick I of Prussia. Königsberg had a magnificent Exchange (completed in 1875) with fine views of the harbour from the staircase. Along Bahnhofsstraße ("Station Street") were the offices of the famous Royal Amber Works – Samland was celebrated as the "Amber Coast". There was also an observatory fitted up by the astronomer Friedrich Bessel, a botanical garden, and a zoological museum. The "Physikalisch", near the Heumarkt, contained botanical and anthropological collections and prehistoric antiquities. Two large theatres built during the Wilhelmine era were the Stadttheater (municipal theatre) and the Apollo.

Königsberg Castle

Königsberg Castle was one of the city's most notable structures. The former seat of the Grand Masters of the Teutonic Knights and the Dukes of Prussia, it contained the Schloßkirche, or palace church, where Frederick I was crowned in 1701 and William I in 1861. It also contained the spacious Moscowiter-Saal, one of the largest halls in the German Reich, and a museum of Prussian history.

A center of education
Königsberg became a center of education when the Albertina University was founded by Duke Albert of Prussia in 1544. The university was opposite the north and east side of the Königsberg Cathedral. Lithuanian scholar Stanislovas Rapalionis, one of the founding fathers of the university, was the first professor of theology.

A multiethnic and multicultural metropolis
As a consequence of the Protestant Reformation, the 1525 and subsequent Prussian church orders called for providing religious literature in the languages spoken by the recipients. Duke Albrecht thus called in a Danzig (Gdańsk) book printer, Hans Weinreich, who was soon joined by other book printers, to publish Lutheran literature not only in German and (New) Latin, but also in Latvian, Lithuanian, Old Prussian and Polish. The expected readership were inhabitants of the duchy, religious refugees, Lutherans in Poland (including neighbouring Warmia) and Lithuania as well as Lutheran priests from Poland and Lithuania called in by the duke. Königsberg thus became a centre for printing German, Polish and Lithuanian books: In 1530, the first Polish translation of Luther's Small Catechism was published by Weinrich. In 1545, Weinreich published two Old Prussian editions of the catechism, which are the oldest printed and second-oldest books in that language after the handwritten 14th-century "Elbing dictionary". The first Lithuanian-language book, Catechismvsa prasty szadei, makslas skaitima raschta yr giesmes by Martynas Mažvydas, was also printed in Königsberg, published by Weinreich in 1547. Further Polish- and Lithuanian-language religious and non-religious prints followed. One of the first newspapers in Polish was published in Königsberg in the years 1718–1720, the Poczta Królewiecka.

Sports

Football clubs which played in Königsberg included VfB Königsberg and SV Prussia-Samland Königsberg.  Lilli Henoch, the world record holder in the discus, shot put, and 4 × 100 meters relay events was born in Königsberg, as was Eugen Sandow, dubbed the "father of modern bodybuilding". Segelclub RHE, Germany's oldest sailing club, was founded in Königsberg in 1855. The club still exists, and is now headquartered in Hamburg.

Cuisine

Königsberg was well known within Germany for its unique regional cuisine. A popular dish from the city was Königsberger Klopse, which is still made today in some specialist restaurants in the now Russian city and elsewhere in present-day Germany.

Other food and drink native to the city included:
 Königsberger Marzipan
 Kopskiekelwein, a wine made from blackcurrants or redcurrants
 Bärenfang
 Ochsenblut, literally "ox blood", a champagne-burgundy cocktail mixed at the popular Blutgericht pub, which no longer exists

Fortifications

The fortifications of Königsberg consist of numerous defensive walls, forts, bastions and other structures. They make up the First and the Second Defensive Belt, built in 1626–1634 and 1843–1859, respectively. The 15-metre-thick First Belt was erected due to Königsberg's vulnerability during the Polish–Swedish wars. The Second Belt was largely constructed on the place of the first one, which was in a bad condition. The new belt included twelve bastions, three ravelins, seven spoil banks and two fortresses, surrounded by water moat. Ten brick gates served as entrances and passages through defensive lines and were equipped with moveable bridges.

There was a Bismarck tower just outside Königsberg, on the Galtgarben, the highest point on the Sambian peninsula. It was built in 1906 and destroyed by German troops sometime in January 1945 as the Soviets approached.

See also 
 List of people from Königsberg
 Seven Bridges of Königsberg, a topology problem
 Kaliningrad (Königsberg) question
 Königsberger Paukenhund, traditional kettle drum dog of the Prussian infantry

References

Citations

Sources

 Biskup, Marian. Königsberg gegenüber Polen und dem Litauen der Jagiellonen zur Zeit des Mittelalters (bis 1525) in Królewiec a Polska Olsztyn 1993 

 Gause, Fritz: Die Geschichte der Stadt Königsberg in Preußen. Three volumes, Böhlau, Cologne 1996,  .

External links

 Photoarchaeology of Kneiphof
 Kaliningrad Photo Gallery – Reisebilder aus Königsberg
 The Film Königsberg is dead, France/Germany 2004 by Max & Gilbert 
 Territory's history from 1815 to 1945 
 Interactive Map with photos of Königsberg and modern Kaliningrad
 Site with 400+ side-by-side photos of 1939/2005 identical locations in Königsberg/Kaliningrad 
 Northeast Prussia 2000: Travel Photos
 Adreßbuch der Haupt- und Residenzstadt Königsberg., Адресная книга Кёнигсберга. (нем. яз.)(1770-1941) 

 
Kaliningrad
Populated places established in the 1250s
Histories of cities in Germany
Capitals of former nations
East Prussia
Germany–Soviet Union relations
Members of the Hanseatic League
Kulm law
1255 establishments in Europe
13th century in the State of the Teutonic Order